The Salamander Washington DC is a luxury Postmodernist-style hotel located at 1330 Maryland Ave SW, Washington, D.C. The hotel is an AAA-rated four diamond and Forbes Travel Guide rated four stars. From 2004 to 2022 it operated as the Mandarin Oriental Washington, D.C..

Completed in 2004, the hotel is near the National Mall and Smithsonian Institution museums, and overlooked the Tidal Basin. The Washington Post calls the hotels location "unconventional". The 373-room hotel is located near downtown Washington, although to reach Capitol Hill guests would need a taxicab or automobile. Guests in rooms on the upper levels have views of the city and its monuments, but the surrounding neighborhood consisted primarily of railroad tracks, freeways, and office buildings.

The Mandarin Oriental features a curving Mansard roof punctuated a points by windows which are either round or arched, and often protected by a pediment. The facade is light tan brick, with double-hung windows in a repetitive pattern piercing the facade. Brennan Beer Gorman Monk also oversaw the interior design. The hotel's vast lobby is lined with marble, and public hallways feature rocking chairs and sofas.

An abandoned railroad bridge to the west of the hotel was converted into a pedestrian bridge and pathway, which connects the Mandarin Oriental and The Portals to the Tidal Basin waterfront.

History

Construction of the hotel
In the 1970s, most of the Southwest quadrant of Washington, D.C., was completely razed in a massive urban renewal effort. One of the last large parcels to be redeveloped was the area bounded by 12th Street SW, D Street SW, Maine Avenue SW, and 14th Street SW. More than a decade passed, as the city sought a developer with sufficient financial resources to develop the tract. In 1985, a team led by Republic Properties finally was chosen by the city to develop what became known as The Portals, four massive office buildings constructed around an extension of Maryland Avenue SW and a new traffic circle. But the developers ran into problems obtaining financing for the entire project, and sold the southeastern portion of the site. The new development team consisted of Mandarin Oriental Hotel Group, Lano International Inc., and Armada Hoffler Construction Co.

In early 2000, Mandarin Oriental Hotels proposed building a $142 million, 400-room hotel on the site. The hotel included  of meeting space,  of retail space, several restaurants, and a fitness center. Mandarin Oriental Hotels sought major tax breaks and financing from the District of Columbia to develop the hotel. Initially, they sought $22 million in tax increment financing (TIF). Under this scheme, the city would sell 20-year bonds worth $22 million, and would turn 75 percent of the money over to the developers. The hotel would pay the usual property and sales taxes, estimated to be $220 million over the life of the bonds. But due to $20 million in increased costs, Mandarin Oriental Hotels was unable to secure all the private financing it needed. The hotel chain returned to the city and asked for $46 million in TIF bonds as well as a $6 million property tax break. The city approved the TIF bonds, but not the property tax reduction.

A year passed, and the city was unable to sell the bonds for the TIF package. The early 2000s recession left bond buyers unsure that the hotel would be able to generate enough tax revenue to cover the bond repayments. The significant economic downturn that occurred after the September 11 attacks in 2001 worsened the city's ability to sell bonds. To correct the problem, the D.C. City Council adopted new legislation to geographically widen the area the TIF bonds drew revenue from. The new TIF district included the neighborhoods of Downtown, Dupont Circle, Foggy Bottom, Logan Circle, and Shaw in addition to Southwest.

But with the post-9/11 economic downturn continuing, the City Council hesitated in approving the package. Mandarin Oriental officials had added a  ballroom, a swimming pool, and a spa to the hotel's amenities. Although Mandarin Oriental obtained $85 million in financing from a banking syndicate and Mandarin International, Lano International, and Armada Hoffler Construction put in $19 million of their own money, the $46 million in TIF money was not enough to allow construction on the hotel to move forward. Mandarin Oriental officials came back to the city and asked for a $4 million property tax deferral, but the City Council did not have the votes to pass the legislation.

Although the cost of the hotel rose to $155 million, in April 2002 Mandarin Oriental Hotel Group said it would proceed with the hotel's construction. By this time, the project was reported by The Washington Post to include just two restaurants and an art gallery in addition to the previously announced meeting space, fitness center, ballroom, pool, and spa. The city never approved the $4 million in property tax deferral, which required the three investors to add another $4 million of their own money to get the project moving.

Salamander Hotels
On September 8, 2022, the hotel was sold by Mandarin Oriental Hotel Group for $139 million to private equity real estate manager Henderson Park, and Middleburg, Virginia-based Salamander Hotels & Resorts assumed management of the hotel, which was renamed Salamander Washington DC on September 13, 2022. Salamander and its founder and CEO, Sheila Johnson, had weighed other prospective deals in the District including at City Ridge, the redevelopment of Fannie Mae's former headquarters.

Critical assessment
Benjamin Forgey, the architectural critic at The Washington Post, was unimpressed by the Mandarin Oriental's architecture. He called it lacking in freshness, "dry, [a] by-the-numbers take on an old tradition. It's a sort of habit." Architect Mark Boekenheide said his goal was to make the Mandarin Oriental look significantly different from the office buildings of The Portals (designed by local architect Arthur Cotton Moore), and yet compatible with them. He succeeded, Forgey agreed, but at a price: The hotel was too reminiscent of the 1986 additions to the Willard InterContinental Washington, which left the Mandarin Oriental looking dated. "A much bolder gesture was called for to connect the new building to the waterfront," Forgey concluded. "And that's the story in a nutshell. The architecture of this prominent building needed more boldness and sophistication. It didn't have to be a Willard-come-lately."

Former Restaurants
The Mandarin Oriental Washington, D.C., featured two restaurants when it opened: the formal CityZen and the informal Cafe Mozu.

CityZen 
CityZen opened in September 2004, and its name was a play on the word "citizen". CityZen is located in a very high-ceilinged room decorated with soothing colors and soft, warm lighting. The kitchen is visible from many of the tables. Executive chef Eric Ziebold left The French Laundry in California to lead CityZen. Sietsma had unqualified, extraordinary praise for CityZen: "If you really care about food, you owe yourself an evening at CityZen. (..) CityZen is still a young restaurant. But already it's an important one." He called the food "often-extraordinary", and CityZen "tantalizingly close to the gold standard." CityZen was named best new restaurant of the year by the Restaurant Association of Metropolitan Washington in June 2005.

The Mandarin Oriental announced that CityZen will close permanently on December 6, 2014 because Chef Ziebold left to open a new venue in downtown D.C. in spring 2015. Rather than find a new chef, the hotel decided to close CityZen, and allow the new chef to create a new restaurant.

CafeMozu 
Cafe Mozu was located on the hotel's first floor. The restaurant featured high ceilings, a view of the Tidal Basin and monuments, and walls adorned with a chrome-and-walnut grid. The restaurant patio overlooked the hotel's garden courtyard. Tom Sietsma, the food critic for The Washington Post, called it "significant", with "understated elegance". He gave slightly qualified praise to the food of executive chef Hidemasa Yamamoto, which was largely Far Eastern cuisine infused with European touches.

Sou'Wester 
Cafe Mozu closed in 2009, and was replaced by Sou'Wester on September 8, 2009. CityZen executive chef Ziebold added executive chef duties at Sou'Wester to his portfolio, changing the menu to reflect the cuisine of the Southern United States. The restaurant's decor was nautical and "retro chic", with warm wood paneling and floor-to-ceiling white drapery resembling sails. Less than $200,000 were spent on remodeling the space and creating an informal dining experience. Food critic Tom Sietsma called the decor "sterile", more like a Courtyard by Marriott hotel space than a Mandarin Oriental four-diamond hotel space. Sietsma was also critical of the cooking, which he found extremely salty, the sandwiches ordinary, and the table service mediocre. However, he praised the vegetable dishes and desserts, and had good things to say about sommelier Carlton McCoy.

Muze 
Sou'Wester closed in December 2013, and was replaced with a new informal restaurant, Muze. Ziebold remained executive chef, but installed a new chef de cuisine to oversee a more Asian-infused cuisine menu. The paneling was replaced with pale yellow walls, although the long white curtains remained. While food critic Tom Sietsma had little good to say about the wait-staff, he found the food a solid improvement. Although several dishes were less than impressive, and some of the more experimental entrees took some getting used to, he found several of the main courses and desserts superb.

Amity & Commerce
Appealing to both visitors and locals, Amity & Commerce was the last restaurant at the Mandarin Oriental Washington DC and closed several months before the hotel's closure (leaving the hotel with only a breakfast room and the Empress lounge). A unique American Bistro and Bar with an international flair. Curated signature dishes rotate daily to complement the delicious modern mainstays, which form the backbone of a menu that feels both bold and familiar. Located just a stone’s throw from the District’s emerging Southwest Waterfront and the iconic Jefferson Memorial, Amity & Commerce features soaring ceilings and a relaxed, yet lively atmosphere. Diners may choose to sit at the 20’ wood-topped Commerce bar, a comfortable table in the Amity dining room, or at one of the communal tables. The Executive chef at Amity & Commerce was Eric Ziebold.

Rating
The AAA gave the hotel four diamonds out of five in 2004. The hotel has maintained that rating every year, and received four diamonds again in 2016. Forbes Travel Guide (formerly known as Mobil Guide) awarded the hotel four out of five stars in 2016. Forbes also gave the Mandarin Oriental's spa four out of five stars in 2016.

Shooting
On July 21, 2022, Shanteari Weems shot her husband James Weems Jr on the eight floor of the hotel. They had argued at the hotel about accusations he had abused children at the Lil Kidz Kastle day care in Baltimore. Both Shanteari and James Weems were licensed to carry firearms and a police detective testified that two guns were in the room, one in a safe and another in a black leather bag. Police said Shanteari left a note inside saying that she wanted to wound her husband, not kill him. The notebook also had writings about putting a bullet in his head, police said. Baltimore County police detectives said they recently began investigating James Weems after they learned about allegations that he sexually abused at least three children. James Weems was arrested while hospitalized and he faces 13 charges of abuse. Shanteari Weems, a former corrections officer, was arrested and charged with assault with intent to kill. A judge denied her pre-trial release Friday and said she should have known that the system would address the allegations against her husband. She is being held in jail without bond and is due back in court on August 9, 2022. Baltimore County police said the day care facility is closed for the time being.

References
Notes

Citations

External links

 Salamander Washington DC official website

Hotels in Washington, D.C.
Hotels established in 2004
Hotel buildings completed in 2004
American companies established in 2004
Southwest Federal Center